Správa železnic, státní organizace (English: Railway Administration, formerly the Správa železnic – SŽ) is the national railway infrastructure manager in the Czech Republic. Its main customers include passenger train operator České dráhy and its cargo subsidiary ČD Cargo.

History 
Správa železnic was founded with the restructuring of ČD from 1 January 2003 (it was called Správa železniční dopravní cesty, státní organizace or SŽDC until 1 January 2020), but until 2008 much of the operations, maintenance and renewals was contracted back to ČD. SŽDC manage  of tracks in the Czech Republic, all which are main lines and almost all regional lines (except Nová Bystřice - Obrataň narrow gauge line and Šumperk - Kouty nad Desnou line).

In August 2010, SŽ was ordered to stop work on all infrastructure projects as part of broader government austerity measures, but in September 2010 works were revived for all projects whose contractors agreed to grant a discount against the tender price. In December 2010 the Minister of Transportation Vít Bárta proposed bringing it into a holding company alongside ČD to "make subsidies more transparent".

In 2010 the revenues from rail network usage reached only CZK 4.3 billion, not even sufficient to cover personal expenses amounting to CZK 4.6 billion. The key budget items allowing management and repairs of the rail network were therefore subsidies from the State Fund for Transport Infrastructure (CZK 8.2 billion) and from the state budget (CZK 1.8 billion). Moreover, SŽ received CZK 15 billion for modernization of the rail network.

In 2012, SŽ started its largest ever infrastructure project; a new railway line between Plzeň and Rokycany, expected to cost 7.53 billion CZK (with 85% funding from the EU). It is expected to be completed in Spring 2015.

In spring of 2019, the member of the Chamber of Deputies of the Czech Republic of the Parliament of the Czech Republic and the member of the Board of Directors of SŽ, Martin Kolovratník proposed that the name of the organization should be shortened to Správa železnic, the version that had been commonly used. The law was enacted on 20 September 2019 and the name change came into effect on 1 January 2020.

Priority projects

Priority projects for 2012-2015 are:
 Reconstructing the station at Břeclav;
 Improving the speed and capacity of the route between Bubeneč and Holešovice stations in Prague;
 Modernising Olomouc main station;
 Upgrading the railway line between Sudoměřice u Tábora and Tábor to allow higher speeds;
 Moving the line through Ústí nad Orlicí whilst preserving the historic station building.
The European Union will provide most of the funding for these projects.

References

External links

 SŽDC website

Railway infrastructure managers
Railway companies of the Czech Republic
Railway companies established in 2003